Paulo Massaro (born 29 December 1981), is a Brazilian football coach and former player who played as a striker. He is the current head coach of CRAC.

Career
Born in Ribeirão Preto, Massaro previously played for Paraná Clube and Rio Branco Sport Club in the Copa do Brasil. His former manager, Saulo de Freitas, brought him from Rio Branco to Paraná.

Paulo joined Valletta F.C. during the winter break for the 2008–09 season.

References

1981 births
Living people
Brazilian people of Italian descent
Brazilian footballers
Paraná Clube players
Valletta F.C. players
Rio Branco Sport Club players
Botafogo Futebol Clube (SP) players
Association football forwards
Brazilian football managers
Clube Atlético Metropolitano managers
Joinville Esporte Clube managers
Rio Branco Sport Club managers
People from Ribeirão Preto
Footballers from São Paulo (state)
Clube Recreativo e Atlético Catalano managers